Abderrahim Tazi (born 1938) is a Moroccan weightlifter. He competed at the 1960 Summer Olympics and the 1964 Summer Olympics.

References

1938 births
Living people
Moroccan male weightlifters
Olympic weightlifters of Morocco
Weightlifters at the 1960 Summer Olympics
Weightlifters at the 1964 Summer Olympics
People from Fez, Morocco
20th-century Moroccan people
21st-century Moroccan people